The year 1800 in art is often estimated to be the beginning of the change from the Neoclassicism movement, that was based on Roman art, to the  Romantic movement, which encouraged emotional art and ended around 1850.

Events
May 31 – The National Art Gallery (Nationale Kunst-Galerij), precursor of the Rijksmuseum, opens in Huis ten Bosch in The Hague, Batavian Republic.
François-André Vincent marries fellow-painter Adélaïde Labille-Guiard.

Works

Jacques-Louis David – Portrait of Madame Récamier
Heinrich Füger – portraits of Lord Nelson
Francisco Goya – La Maja desnuda (approximate completion date)
Henry Raeburn – The MacDonald Children (approximate date)
George Stubbs – Hambletonian Rubbing Down
Benjamin West – Joshua Passing the River Jordan with the Ark of the Covenant

Births
January 12 – Eugène Lami, French painter and lithographer (died 1890)
February 1 – Thomas Cole, English-born American landscape painter (died 1848)
February 6 – Achille Devéria, French painter and lithographer (died 1857)
February 9 – Joseph von Führich, Austrian painter (died 1876)
February 22 – Richard Seymour-Conway, 4th Marquess of Hertford, English francophile art collector (died 1870)
March 10 – Thomas Webster, English genre painter (died 1886)
May 26 – Charles-Philogène Tschaggeny
June 9 – James Wilson Carmichael, English marine painter (died 1868)
July 2 – Piotr Michałowski, Polish portrait painter (died 1855)
July 11 – Charles Lees, Scottish portrait painter (died 1880)
August 10 – George Cattermole, English illustrator and watercolourist (died 1868)
October 14 – John Hogan, Irish sculptor (died 1858)
November 20 – Richard Rothwell, Irish portrait and genre painter (died 1868)
date unknown
Auguste-Joseph Carrier, French miniature painter (died 1875)
Frederick Yeates Hurlstone, English painter (died 1869)
probable
Charles Codman, landscape painter of Portland, Maine (died 1842)
Achille Leonardi, Italian artist (died 1870)

Deaths
May 21 – Carl August Ehrensvärd, Swedish naval officer, painter, author, and neo-classical architect (born 1745)
October 25 – Thomas Macklin, art dealer (born c.1753)
December – Jean-Baptiste Audebert, naturalist and artist (born 1759)
December 5 – Carlo Frigerio, painter (born 1763)
date unknown
Manuel Acevedo, Spanish painter (born 1744)
John Clayton, painter (born 1728)
Francisco Agustín y Grande, Spanish painter of the Neoclassic style (born 1753)
François-Nicolas Martinet, engraver and naturalist (born c.1760)
Louis Rolland Trinquesse, painter (born c.1746)
Henry Wigstead, painter and caricaturist
probable – Nicolas Benjamin Delapierre, French artist (born 1739)

References

 
Years of the 18th century in art
1800s in art